There have been two baronetcies created for members of the Boughton, later Rouse-Boughton family, one in the Baronetage of England and one in the Baronetage of Great Britain.

The Boughton Baronetcy, of Lawford in the County of Warwick, was created in the Baronetage of England on 4 August 1641 for William Boughton of Lawford Hall, at Little Lawford near Rugby, Warwickshire, as a reward for services to the Royalist cause. Several members of the family served as High Sheriff of Warwickshire. The second and fourth Baronets both sat as Knight of the Shire for Warwickshire. The baronetcy descended in direct male line until Sir Theodosius, the 7th Baronet, still a minor, died in mysterious circumstances in 1780. He was confined to his bed by severe illness at Lawford Hall, where his mother and sister, Mrs Donellan, wife of Captain Donellan, were living. He died immediately after taking a draught from the hands of Lady Boughton, and after his body was exhumed on a suspicion of poisoning, a Coroner's inquest returned a verdict of murder against Captain Donellan. Captain Donellan, who was known as Diamond Donellan, because of a large diamond he had brought back from India, was tried condemned and executed for the crime, although the evidence against him was solely circumstantial and he died solemnly protesting his innocence.  His widow subsequently married Sir Egerton Leigh Bt.

The title was inherited by a half cousin, (grandson of the 4th Baronet by his second wife Catherine), Sir Edward Boughton, 8th Baronet, who sold Lawford Hall (later demolished) and the Warwickshire estate in 1793.  Sir Edward Boughton died and left his estate to Eliza Davies, his illegitimate daughter. She later married Sir George Charles Braithwaite, 2nd Baronet (1762–1809). Edward's brother Charles, who followed as 9th Baronet in 1794, had on 28 July 1791 been created a Baronet, of Boughton of Rouse Lench in the County of Worcester, in the Baronetage of Great Britain. He married the heiress of an estate in Downton, Shropshire and thereafter the family seat was at Downton Hall near Ludlow. The 11th, 12th and 13th Baronets all served as high sheriffs of Shropshire. Both baronetcies remained united until they became extinct on the death of the 13th/5th Baronet in 1963.

Boughton baronets, of Lawford (1642) 
Sir William Boughton, 1st Baronet (1600–1656)
Sir Edward Boughton, 2nd Baronet (1628–1680)
Sir William Boughton, 3rd Baronet (1632–1683)
Sir William Boughton, 4th Baronet (1663–1716)
Sir Edward Boughton, 5th Baronet (1689–1722)
Sir Edward Boughton, 6th Baronet (1719–1772)
Sir Theodosius Boughton, 7th Baronet (1760–1780)
Sir Edward Boughton, 8th Baronet (1742–1794)
Sir Charles William Rouse-Boughton, 9th Baronet (died 1821) (created a Baronet in 1791; see below)
see below for further succession

Rouse-Boughton baronets, of Rouse Lench (1791) 

Sir Charles William Rouse-Boughton, 1st and 9th Baronet (died 1821)
Sir William Edward Rouse-Boughton, 2nd and 10th Baronet (1788–1856)
Sir Charles Henry Rouse-Boughton, 3rd and 11th Baronet (1825–1906)
Sir William St Andrew Rouse-Boughton, 4th and 12th Baronet (1853–1937)
Sir Edward Hotham Rouse-Boughton, 5th and 13th Baronet (1893–1963)

See also 
Rouse baronets
Alexander Armstrong, comedian, descended from the family.

References 

 
 
 
 

Extinct baronetcies in the Baronetage of England
Extinct baronetcies in the Baronetage of Great Britain